Daniel Roy LeMahieu (November 5, 1946 – February 18, 2022) was an American politician and legislator in Wisconsin.

Born in Sheboygan, Wisconsin, LeMahieu graduated from Oostburg High School in 1964 before attending University of Wisconsin–Sheboygan and University of Wisconsin–Milwaukee.

LeMahieu served in the United States Army from 1969 to 1971. He later had a career as a newspaper publisher. LeMahieu served in the Wisconsin State Assembly from 2003 to 2015. Devin LeMahieu, a member of the Wisconsin Senate, is his son.

LeMahieu died in Green Bay, Wisconsin, on February 18, 2022, at the age of 75.

References

1946 births
2022 deaths
21st-century American politicians
Politicians from Sheboygan, Wisconsin
University of Wisconsin–Milwaukee alumni
Editors of Wisconsin newspapers
Military personnel from Wisconsin
United States Army soldiers
Republican Party members of the Wisconsin State Assembly